Taphroscelidia is a genus of beetles in the family Passandridae.

Species
 Taphroscelidia atra Grouvelle
 Taphroscelidia atratula Grouvelle
 Taphroscelidia contorta Burckhardt & Slipinski
 Taphroscelidia dentata Burckhardt & Slipinski
 Taphroscelidia filum Reitter
 Taphroscelidia gounellei Grouvelle
 Taphroscelidia humeralis Grouvelle
 Taphroscelidia linearis Leconte
 Taphroscelidia nigra Burckhardt
 Taphroscelidia postica Grouvelle
 Taphroscelidia rostrata Sharp
 Taphroscelidia semicastanea Reitter
 Taphroscelidia sharpi Grouvelle
 Taphroscelidia tenuissima Reitter

References

Passandridae